Tabernacle Hill is a butte formed by a dormant volcano in the west-central portion of Utah, United States.

Description

The ring of hills that include Tabernacle Hill is approximately 1 km in diameter, and it sits somewhat off center to the southeast of a lava field approximately 5 km in diameter.

Geology
Tabernacle Hill is part of the Black Rock Desert volcanic field.  The lava of Tabernacle Hill is basalt and tuff of late Pleistocene age.  The basalt erupted from the vent at Tabernacle Hill into Lake Bonneville when it was at the Provo level.

Tabernacle Hill lies south of The Cinders, the youngest lava flow in Utah.

The basalt of the Cinders and Tabernacle hill was first mapped by geologists Grove Karl Gilbert and Israel Russell in 1890 (see map below).

References

Volcanoes of Utah
Buttes of the United States
Volcanic fields of the Great Basin section
Landforms of Millard County, Utah
Volcanic fields of Utah